Leonard is a city in Fannin County, Texas, United States. The population was 1,990 at the 2010 census.

Geography

Leonard is located in southwestern Fannin County at  (33.383165, –96.245248). U.S. Route 69 passes along the northern and eastern edges of the city, leading northwest  to Denison and southeast  to Greenville. Texas State Highway 78 leads northeast  to Bonham, the Fannin County seat, and southwest  to Farmersville.

Demographics

2020 census

As of the 2020 United States census, there were 1,987 people, 858 households, and 624 families residing in the city.

2000 census
As of the census of 2000, there were 1,846 people, 683 households, and 497 families residing in the city. The population density was 936.8 people per square mile (361.8/km2). There were 751 housing units at an average density of 381.1 per square mile (147.2/km2). The racial makeup of the city was 84.99% White, 5.53% African American, 1.90% Native American, 0.11% Asian, 5.69% from other races, and 15.8% from two or more races. Hispanic or Latino of any race were 7.85% of the population.

There were 683 households, out of which 39.4% had children under the age of 18 living with them, 55.9% were married couples living together, 13.8% had a female householder with no husband present, and 27.2% were non-families. 25.2% of all households were made up of individuals, and 13.9% had no one living alone who was 65 years of age or older. The average household size was 2.65 and the average family size was 3.16.

In the city, the population was spread out, with 30.2% under the age of 18, 8.9% from 18 to 24, 27.7% from 25 to 44, 19.4% from 45 to 64, and 13.9% who were 65 years of age or older. The median age was 33 years. For every 100 females, there were 93.1 males. For every 100 females age 18 and over, there were 82.8 males.

The median income for a household in the city was $34,318, and the median income for a family was $40,461. Males had a median income of $32,071 versus $20,888 for females. The per capita income for the city was $14,747. About 12.9% of families and 17.7% of the population were below the poverty line, including 20.5% of those under age 18 and 27.5% of those age 65 or over.

Education
The city of Leonard is served by the Leonard Independent School District.

Notable people
Polly McLarry, baseball player
Lori Erica Ruff, identity thief
Jules V. Sikes, Texas A&M athlete and coach

Photo gallery

Climate
The climate in this area is characterized by hot, humid summers and generally mild to cool winters.  According to the Köppen Climate Classification system, Leonard has a humid subtropical climate, abbreviated "Cfa" on climate maps.

References

External links
 City of Leonard official website
 Leonard Chamber of Commerce
 City-Data.com listing for Leonard

Cities in Texas
Cities in Fannin County, Texas